Cork is the second largest city of Ireland and largest county in Ireland and has produced many noted artists, entertainers, politicians and business people.

Historical and/or political figures 
 John Anderson – businessman
 Sir John Arnott – businessman, newspaper owner
 Anthony Barry – politician, photographer
 Mick Barry – Teachta Dála and Socialist politician.
 Peter Barry – Tánaiste
 Tadhg Barry – journalist, trade unionist and nationalist
 Tom Barry – guerilla leader during war of independence, author of the book Guerilla Days in Ireland
 Olive Beamish – suffragette activist
 Anne Bonny – pirate
 Joseph Brennan – civil servant
 Sir George Callaghan – Admiral of the Fleet
 Patrick Cleburne – Major General in the Confederate States Army during the American Civil War
 Hugh Coveney – government minister
 Simon Coveney – Tánaiste
 Thomas Croke – Archbishop of Cashel
 Donal Creed (1924 – 2017): Fine Gael politician; MEP, Teachta Dála, Minister of State under Garret FitzGerald
 Michael Creed (b. 1963): Former Minister for Agriculture, Food and the Marine
 Eileen Desmond – government minister, Senator, MEP
 Mary Elmes – aid worker honoured as 'Righteous Among the Nations' for saving 200 Jewish children during WWII
 Gerald Goldberg – first Jewish lord mayor
 T. C. Hammond – Church of Ireland clergyman
 William Baylor Hartland – plant breeder, seedsman
 John Pope Hennessy – author, governor of Hong Kong and Mauritius
 Ellen Hutchins – botanist
 Mary Harris "Mother" Jones – labour organiser, born near Cork
 Jim Lane – Irish Republican Socialist
 Cornelius Lucey – Bishop of Cork and Ross
 Jack Lynch – Taoiseach and hurler
 Thomas Mac Curtain – Lord Mayor of Cork
 Terence MacSwiney – Lord Mayor and hunger striker
 Daniel Mannix – Roman Catholic Archbishop of Melbourne
 Micheál Martin – Taoiseach
 Stephen Moylan – Quartermaster General of the Continental Army during the American Revolutionary War
 Michael Murphy – first Irish president of the European Court of Auditors
Nano Nagle – educator who founded the Presentation Sisters
William O'Brien – nationalist politician and MP; founder of All-for-Ireland League
 Dáithí Ó Conaill – Irish republican
 Jeremiah O'Donovan Rossa – nationalist
 Batt O'Keeffe – government minister
 Michael O'Riordan – socialist politician
 John Cyril Porte – pioneer aviator
 John Roach – major shipbuilder in postbellum United States
 Adi Roche – humanitarian campaigner
 Brendan Ryan – Senator and lecturer at CIT
 William Henry John Seffern – printer, newspaper editor, journalist and historian
 D. D. Sheehan – nationalist politician and first Labour MP
 Kathy Sinnott – MEP
 Robert Spence – Roman Catholic Archbishop of Adelaide
 William Thompson – political and philosophical writer
 Sir Robert Torrens – Prime Minister South Australia; pioneer of Land Registration system
 Thady Quill – historical rake

Military
James Adams – recipient of the Victoria Cross	
Francisco Burdett O'Connor – officer in the Irish Legion of Simón Bolívar's army
Michael Collins – revolutionary leader, and Chairman of Provisional Government
John Dunlay – recipient of the Victoria Cross
William English – recipient of the Victoria Cross
Richard Fitzgerald – recipient of the Victoria Cross
Thomas Kent – Irish nationalist
Thomas Lane – recipient of the Victoria Cross
Samuel Lawrence – recipient of the Victoria Cross
David Lord – recipient of the Victoria Cross
Ambrose Madden – recipient of the Victoria Cross
Mick Mannock – recipient of the Victoria Cross
James Murray – recipient of the Victoria Cross
Timothy O'Hea – recipient of the Victoria Cross
Daniel Florence O'Leary – Irish-born Venezuelan brigadier general of Simón Bolívar's army 
Michael O'Leary – recipient of the Victoria Cross
Gerald O'Sullivan – recipient of the Victoria Cross
John Sullivan – recipient of the Victoria Cross
James Travers – recipient of the Victoria Cross
Joseph Ward – recipient of the Victoria Cross

Sports 
 John Allen – former Irish hurler and Gaelic footballer
 Hugh T. Baker – cricketer
 Mick Barry – road bowler
 James Brophy – cricketer
 Noel Cantwell – international footballer
 Graham Canty – footballer and international rules captain
 Brian Carney – rugby league, and rugby union footballer of the 1990s and 2000s
 Mark Carroll – long distance athlete 
 Joe Cleary – major league baseball player
 Mark Cohen – cricketer
 Joe Deane – hurler
 Damien Delaney – international footballer
 Patrick Dineen – cricketer
 Jack Doyle – boxer
 John Egan – association footballer
 Joe English (sailor), round the world sailor and international yachtsman.
 Percy Exham – cricketer
 James Foley – cricketer
 William Harman – cricketer
 Ryan Hartslief – footballer and rugby player
 Colin Healy – international footballer
 Marian Heffernan – Olympian 
 Robert Heffernan – Olympic bronze medalist 
 Tom Horan – cricketer (Australia)
 Denis Irwin – international footballer
 Roy Keane – international footballer
 Caoimhín Kelleher – footballer 
 Alan Lewis – cricketer, rugby union referee
 Jack McAuliffe – boxer
 Teddy McCarthy – GAA sportsman, played on both Cork hurling and football double winning teams
 Darren McNamara – professional drift driver
 Sam Maguire – GAA sportsman
 David Meyler – international footballer
 Liam Miller – international footballer
 Tony Mullane – major league baseball player
 Donncha O'Callaghan – rugby union player
 Dr. Pat O'Callaghan – twice Olympic gold medalist
 Frank O'Farrell – international footballer and manager
 Ronan O'Gara – rugby union player
 Seán Óg Ó hAilpín – hurler
 Ciarán Ó Lionáird – international middle distance athlete
 John O'Shea – darts player
 Derval O'Rourke – world indoor champion hurdler and European outdoor silver medalist 2006
 Marcus O'Sullivan – middle distance athlete
 Sonia O'Sullivan – Olympic silver medalist, world champion athlete and cross country runner
 Christy Ring – hurler
 Peter Stringer – rugby union player

Film, entertainment and media 
 Jack Gleeson – actor
 Sarah Greene – actor
 Eddie Hobbs – TV personality
 George Hook – TV/radio personality
 Fergal Keane, OBE – BBC journalist
 Danny La Rue, OBE – female impersonator
 James Leonard and Timmy Long of The Two Norries podcast
 Joe Lynch – actor
 Mark Mahon – film director
 Pixie McKenna – TV personality, doctor
 Edward Mulhare – TV actor
 Cillian Murphy – actor
 Graham Norton – TV personality
 Bill O'Herlihy – TV personality
 Jonathan Rhys-Meyers – actor
 Tony Scannell – actor
 Fiona Shaw, CBE – actor
 Cailín Ní Toibín – beauty pageant titleholder
 Niall Tóibín – comic actor
 Eileen Walsh – actor
 Nora Twomey – animator

Literature 
 Máire Bradshaw – poet and publisher
 Daniel Corkery – writer
 Patrick Galvin – poet, singer and playwright
 Trevor Joyce – poet
 Helmut Kollars – writer and illustrator
 Frank O'Connor – author
 Seán Ó Faoláin – writer
 Joseph O'Neill – writer
 Seán Ó Ríordáin – poet
 P.A. Ó Síocháin – journalist, author, lawyer and Irish language activist
 James O'Sullivan – writer and academic
 Canon Patrick Augustine Sheehan – Catholic priest, author, political activist
 William Trevor – writer
 William Wall – author

Music and arts 
 Abraham Abell – antiquarian
 James Barry – neoclassical painter
 Kim Carroll – composer and guitarist
 Cathal Coughlan – singer/songwriter
 Dorothy Cross - artist
 Robert Day – antiquarian, photographer
 Ricky Dineen – musician
 Gavin Dunne (better known as Miracle of Sound) – musician
 Chloe Early – artist
 Mick Flannery – singer-songwriter
 Aloys Fleischmann – composer, professor of music at UCC
 Rory Gallagher – singer/songwriter and guitarist
 Patrick Hennessy – painter
 John Hogan – sculptor
 Pina Kollars – singer/songwriter
 Sir Hugh Lane – patron of arts
 Charles Lynch – classical pianist
 Mick Lynch – singer
 Daniel Maclise – artist
 Jimmy McCarthy – singer/songwriter
 Lyra McNamara – singer/songwriter
 Paul McSwiney – composer and dramatist
 Sean O'Hagan – musician
 Una Palliser – violinist, violist, singer
 Brian Smyth – painter
 John Spillane – singer/songwriter
 Henry Jones Thaddeus – painter
 Finbar Wright – singer/songwriter

Bands
 Five Go Down to the Sea?
 The Frank and Walters
 Stump
 The Sultans of Ping FC

References

People
Cork